Kunzea ambigua, commonly known as white kunzea, poverty bush or tick bush, is a plant in the myrtle family, Myrtaceae and is found mainly on sandstone soils in eastern Australia. Used in native gardening, it attracts native insects. It is also used in amenities planting and sand dune stabilization.

Description
Kunzea ambigua is a small- to medium-sized spreading shrub that may reach  both in height and width, though is usually much smaller (from ). Its bark is fibrous and furrowed, while the narrow lanceolate green leaves are 0.5–1.3 cm in length and 0.2 cm wide, with hairy new growth. Occurring from September to December or January, the white flowers are 1.2 cm in diameter and sweetly fragrant. The stamens are longer than the petals. The flowers are followed by small woody capsules 0.4 cm in diameter.

Taxonomy and naming
Kunzea ambigua was first formally described in 1797 by James Edward Smith who gave it the name Leptospermum ambiguum. English botanist George Claridge Druce gave it its current binomial name in 1917. The generic name honours German naturalist Gustav Kunze, while the specific epithet is derived from the Latin adjective ambiguus meaning "doubtful" or "uncertain". Its common names are white kunzea and tick bush.

A pale pink-flowered hybrid with Kunzea capitata has been recorded from Stony Range Flora reserve in Dee Why in Sydney's northern beaches region.

Distribution and habitat
Kunzea ambigua is found from northeastern New South Wales, having been recorded in the Grand High Tops of the Warrumbungle National Park, through Victoria and into Tasmania. It grows on sandy soils in coastal or near-coastal regions. It is a very common dry forest shrub of the Sydney region, and regenerates in disturbed or cleared areas. It is associated with scrub she-oak (Allocasuarina distyla), Melaleuca nodosa, cheese tree (Glochidion ferdinandi) in heath or scrub, and with red bloodwood (Corymbia gummifera), peppermint gum (Eucalyptus piperita), forest red gum (Eucalyptus tereticornis), woolybutt (E. longifolia), thin-leaved stringybark  (E. eugenioides), and white feather honeymyrtle  (Melaleuca decora) in forested areas. In Wilsons Promontory in Victoria, Kunzea ambigua is the dominant species within scattered areas of treeless heath that occur on granite hills and mountains.

In recent times, it has been discovered that the Kunzea ambigua plant grows abundantly in Flinders Island and North East Tasmania. Tasmania regularly experiences strong westerly winds and a high annual rainfall of over 700mm. This harsh, windy and brisk climate is the ideal environment for the Kunzea ambigua plant to thrive.

Ecology
Insects are the main pollinators of Kunzea ambigua; these include various types of beetles including jewel beetles (Buprestidae), scarab beetles (Scarabaeidae), flower beetles (Mordellidae), and checkered beetles (Cleridae) as well as butterflies, flies, bees and wasps. The tick bush is killed by fire and regenerates from seed. Plants can also colonise unburnt sites with ample sunlight.

Use in horticulture
It was one of the first species of Australian plant introduced into cultivation in England. It is a hardy and adaptable plant that is used in windbreaks and sand dune stabilization plantings, as well as gardens, particularly in Australian gardens using native plants according to principles of natural landscaping. The species attracts Australian native insects, and can provide shelter for small birds and the long-nosed bandicoot (Perameles nasuta).

It can regenerate quickly after disturbance, suggesting it may have weedy potential if planted outside its natural range.

Therapeutic benefits
Kunzea ambigua is registered with the Therapeutic Goods Administration for use in "Kunzea Pain Relief Cream" and "Vita Future Nasal Congestion Relief".

References

External links

Plantnet site of Royal Botanic Gardens NSW, showing herbarium record within New South Wales

ambigua
Flora of New South Wales
Flora of Tasmania
Flora of Victoria (Australia)
Garden plants of Australia
Myrtales of Australia
Taxa named by George Claridge Druce
Plants described in 1797